Appleton Township is a township in Clark County, Kansas, United States. As of the 2000 census, its population was 921.

Geography
According to the USGS, it contains one cemetery, Minneola.

The streams of Brites Creek, Hackberry Creek, Hargis Creek and Simmons Creek run through this township.

Transportation
Appleton Township contains one airport or landing strip, Kennedy Glider Port.

References
 USGS Geographic Names Information System (GNIS)

External links
 City-Data.com

Townships in Clark County, Kansas
Townships in Kansas